The lesser robust fine-lined slider (Lerista karlschmidti)  is a species of skink found in the Northern Territory and Queensland in Australia. Its range is highly disjunct and it is likely that only the Queensland population (not seen after its original collection) represents Lerista karlschmidti, while the Northern Territory one is a distinct species. It is named after Karl Patterson Schmidt.

References

Lerista
Skinks of Australia
Endemic fauna of Australia
Reptiles of the Northern Territory
Reptiles of Queensland
Reptiles described in 1959
Taxa named by Hymen Marx
Taxa named by William Hosmer (herpetologist)